Most community colleges in the United States do not offer on-campus housing for students. These institutions were established primarily to provide low-cost education for students who commute from their homes. However, there is an increasing trend toward offering dormitories on these campuses, particularly because increased costs are causing more students who would typically enroll in a traditional four-year college to attend a two-year school instead. Also, community colleges are increasingly recruiting student athletes and students from outside the U.S., who are more likely to need or want on-campus housing.

Community colleges providing arrangements for on-campus student housing are listed below.

United States community colleges with campus housing

United States technical colleges with campus housing 

'''

References